The 108th New York State Legislature, consisting of the New York State Senate and the New York State Assembly, met from January 6 to May 22, 1885, during the first year of David B. Hill's governorship, in Albany.

Background
Under the provisions of the New York Constitution of 1846, 32 Senators and 128 assemblymen were elected in single-seat districts; senators for a two-year term, assemblymen for a one-year term. The senatorial districts were made up of entire counties, except New York County (seven districts) and Kings County (three districts). The Assembly districts were made up of entire towns, or city wards, forming a contiguous area, all within the same county.

At this time there were two major political parties: the Democratic Party and the Republican Party. In New York City the Democrats were split into three factions: Tammany Hall, "Irving Hall" and the "County Democrats". The Prohibition Party; and a fusion of the Greenback Party, the Anti-Monopoly Party and the "People's Party", also nominated tickets.

Elections
The New York state election, 1884 was held on November 4. Governor Grover Cleveland was elected U.S. President. The only two statewide elective offices up for election were two judgeships on the New York Court of Appeals, which were carried by the two cross-endorsed incumbents, one Democrats and one Republican.

Sessions
The Legislature met for the regular session at the State Capitol in Albany on January 6, 1885; and adjourned on May 15.

On January 6, Gov. Grover Cleveland resigned, and Lt. Gov. David B. Hill succeeded to the office.

George Z. Erwin (R) was elected Speaker with 72 votes against 51 for William Caryl Ely (D).

On January 20, the Legislature elected William M. Evarts (R) to succeed Elbridge G. Lapham (R) as U.S. Senator from New York, for a six-year term beginning on March 4, 1885.

On May 15, the Legislature adjourned. While the members were exchanging farewells, copies of Gov. Hill's proclamation for a special session, to convene on the same day at 4 p.m., were delivered to the clerks of the Senate and the Assembly. The special session was called to consider again — Hill had vetoed a census bill during the regular session — action to be taken concerning the decennial enumeration which, under the Constitution, was due in 1885. In his message to the Legislature, Hill stated that the Constitution required an "enumeration", but not a "census". No enumeration or census bill was passed until 1891.

State Senate

Districts

Note: There are now 62 counties in the State of New York. The counties which are not mentioned in this list had not yet been established, or sufficiently organized, the area being included in one or more of the abovementioned counties.

Members
The asterisk (*) denotes members of the previous Legislature who continued in office as members of this Legislature.

Employees
 Clerk: John W. Vrooman
 Sergeant-at-Arms: George A. Goss
 Doorkeeper: David W. Bogert
 Stenographer: Hudson C. Tanner
 Postmaster: A. E. Darrow
 Janitor: A. L. Neidick
 Chaplain: S. V. Leech

State Assembly

Assemblymen
The asterisk (*) denotes members of the previous Legislature who continued as members of this Legislature.

Employees
 Clerk: Charles A. Chickering
 Sergeant-at-Arms: Edward H. Talbott
 Doorkeeper: Michael Maher
 Assistant Doorkeeper: Herman K. Fox
Assistant Doorkeeper: John Christie
 Stenographer: Emory P. Close

Notes

Sources
 The New York Red Book compiled by Edgar L. Murlin (published by James B. Lyon, Albany NY, 1897; see pg. 384f for senate districts; pg. 403 for senators; pg. 410–417 for Assembly districts; and pg. 504 for assemblymen)
 Biographical sketches of the Members of the Legislature in The Evening Journal Almanac (1885) [e-book]
 ERWIN DEFEATS HUBBELL in NYT on January 6, 1885

108
1885 in New York (state)
1885 U.S. legislative sessions